Donnell Thompson  (born October 27, 1958) is a former defensive end who played for the Indy. Colts in the National Football League (NFL).  Thompson graduated from the University of North Carolina. His parents are Berthel and Douglas Thompson.

After leaving the NFL, Thompson became a franchisee for McDonald's  in Atlanta, Georgia. He purchased his own franchise in 1998 and has since opened franchises for Choice Hotels International, Zaxby's, Denny's and Checkers Drive-In, sometimes in partnership with his former roommate Ron Wooten.

References

1958 births
Living people
People from Lumberton, North Carolina
Players of American football from North Carolina
American football defensive ends
North Carolina Tar Heels football players
Baltimore Colts players
Indianapolis Colts players